FGS Global, formerly Finsbury, is a public relations company based in London and New York that specialises in financial services clients. It is a subsidiary of British advertising and media conglomerate WPP plc.

History
Finsbury was founded by Roland Rudd in 1994 as Finsbury. In 2001, the firm was sold to WPP in a deal that the Financial Times estimated earned Rudd £40 million. Rudd remained chairman of the company.

In 2011, Finsbury merged with Robinson Lerer & Montgomery of New York to form RLM Finsbury. Rudd continued as chairman and Walter G. Montgomery became chief executive officer of the enlarged firm. Montgomery retired as chief executive officer in 2014 but remains a partner in the firm.

2012 Wikipedia editing
On 12 November 2012, The Times reported that Alisher Usmanov, a Russian billionaire who was about to launch one of the largest stock market listings in London for his MegaFon mobile phone company hired RLM Finsbury which "covertly cleaned up his online image and removed details of his past" before the offering. The Telegraph reported specifically that RLM Finsbury staff anonymously "deleted details of a Soviet-era criminal conviction and freedom of speech row" and then "replaced those sections with text outlining Mr Usmanov's philanthropy and art collection." According to O'Dwyer's PR, the firm publicly apologized in The Times, giving the following statement: "This was not done in the proper manner nor was this approach authorized by Mr. Usmanov. We apologize for this and it will not happen again."

Finsbury rebrand
In 2014, RLM Finsbury rebranded to Finsbury which the firm felt would underline its global ambitions.

In 2020, Finsbury developed "Finsbury’s Workforce Return", a service that guided businesses in managing employees returning to the workplace after the COVID-19 pandemic lockdowns.

Finsbury Glover Hering
In January 2021, Finsbury, The Glover Park Group (GPG), and Hering Schuppener completed their merger and management buy-in of 49.99%, and became known as Finsbury Glover Hering. At that stage, the company had 18 offices and almost 700 consultants worldwide. WPP remained a 50.01% investor. Following the merger, Rudd and Carter Eskew, founder of GPG, served as co-chairs of the new firm, and Alexander Geiser, managing partner at Hering Schuppener, served as CEO. As of October 2021, the business was worth $917 million.

FGS Global
In December 2021, Finsbury Glover Hering and Sand Verbinnen & Co. merged and rebranded as FGS Global, with Geiser appointed as CEO. The agency then had 25 offices in North America, Europe, Asia and the Middle East, and over 1,000 employees. In October 2022, FGS Global opened its eighth office in Europe. Also in 2022, the firm ranked number one in terms of the volume and the value of mergers and acquisitions deals. In January 2023, FGS Global led communication consulting in operations in Spain.

Shareholders 
As of 2023, WPP owned 57.4% of FGS Global. Golden Gate Capital owned 40% of Sand Verbidden & Co., and holds a small stake in FGS Global following the merger. About 40% of the company’s employees are shareholders, of which 25.9% were FGH employees.

References

Public relations companies of the United Kingdom
Public relations companies of the United States
Companies based in the City of Westminster
Companies based in New York City
British companies established in 1994
WPP plc
2001 mergers and acquisitions